Holsum Bread is an American brand of packaged sliced white bread. The Holsum name was being used by many retail bakeries, independently, around the country by the early 1900s. In 1908, the W. E. Long Company of Chicago acquired exclusive national rights to the name and formed a cooperative of  bakeries to market a single recipe under the brand name Holsum in various cities.

One of the largest, earliest, and longest-lasting of the Long Company member bakeries was the Phoenix Bakery, which was renamed the Holsum Bakery in 1929 after then owners Lloyd Eisele and Charles Becker purchased from the Long Company the rights to use the Holsum name for their bakery and its bread . Flowers Foods, one of the southern U.S. region distributors, bought Holsum Bakery in 2008.

The Long Company was named after its founder William Edgar Long.  In 1928, Long created and pioneered the concept of packaging sliced bread two years before the Wonder brand of packaged sliced bread appeared on store shelves. The Holsum brand name remains a registered trademark of the Long Company cooperative, which has expanded across the United States, Canada, Mexico, and Puerto Rico.

List of Holsum Bread licensees
Aunt Millie's Bakery
Michigan
Bimbo Bakeries USA
Colorado (Sara Lee)
Delaware (Butter Krust)
Louisiana
Maryland (Butter Krust)
New Jersey (Butter Krust)
New York (Butter Krust)
North Carolina (Butter Krust)
Pennsylvania (Butter Krust)
West Virginia (Butter Krust)
Utah (Sara Lee)
Virginia (Butter Krust)
Flowers Foods
Alabama
Arizona (Holsum Bakery)
California (Holsum Bakery)
New Mexico (Holsum Bakery)
Utah (Holsum Bakery)
Gold Medal Bakery
Connecticut
Maine
Massachusetts
New Hampshire
New Jersey
New York
Rhode Island
Vermont
Holsum De Puerto Rico (Puerto Rico Baking Company)
Puerto Rico
Klosterman Baking Company
Kentucky
Ohio
Lewis Bakeries
Alabama
Georgia
Illinois
Indiana
Mississippi
Missouri
Ohio
South Carolina
Tennessee
Wisconsin
Pan-O-Gold Baking Company
Minnesota
North Dakota
South Dakota
Wisconsin
Iowa
Nebraska
Illinois
Schmidt Baking Company
Pennsylvania
United States Bakery
Alaska
California
Idaho
Montana
Oregon
Washington

See also
 List of brand name breads
 Luis Aguad Jorge- alias "El enanito de Holsum"

References

External links

 
Brand name breads
Grupo Bimbo brands